Hits 55 is a compilation album released in the UK released in March 2003. It contains 40 tracks spread over two CDs, including five number one singles from Christina Aguilera, Gareth Gates, Darius Danesh, DJ Sammy, and Elvis Presley vs. JXL
The album was the first in the Hits series to contain the subtitle 40 Massive Chart Hits, although was not the first Hits album to contain 40 tracks.

Track listing
Disc one

Disc two

See also
Now 54 (rival album)

References

2003 compilation albums
Hits (compilation series) albums